The law of Albania is civil law.

Constitution

There have been constitutions of 1914, 1925, 1928, 1939, 1946, 1976 and 1998.

Legislation
The legislature is the Parliament of Albania. The gazette is the Fletorja Zyrtare.

List of legislation

Criminal Code of 1 October 1977
Law of 25 December 1979 (Law No 6069)
Labour Code of October 1981
Law on main constitutional clauses of 29 April 1991 (Law No 7491)
Law on the Organization of the National Intelligence Service of 2 July 1991 (Law No 7495)
Law Concerning the Savings Bank of 31 July 1991 (Law No 7505)
Law on foreign investments of 4 August 1992 (Law No 7549) 
Banking Statute of 28 April 1992 (Law No 7560) 
Law on the Introductory Part of a Commercial Code of 4 November 1992 (Law No 7632)
Law on Foreign Investment of 2 November 1993 (Law No 7764) 
Criminal Code of 27 January 1995 (Law No 7895)
Code of Criminal Procedure of 21 March 1995 (Law No 7905)
Labour Code of 12 July 1995 (Law No 7961)
Law about the administration of the refused agricultural land of 14 December 1995 (Law No 8047) 
Law for Non-divided Agricultural Lands of 26 March 1998 (Law No 8312) 
Law On Leasing the Agricultural Land, Forest Land Meadows and Pastures, which are State Property of 1 April 1998 (Law No 8318) 
Law On Private International Law of 2 June 2011 (LAW No. 10 428) 
Law On forests and forest police
Law On pastures and meadows

Decree Concerning the Albanian Commercial Bank of 1 December 1990 (Decree No 7493)

Civil codes
See the Civil Code of the Republic of Albania, 1991. Civil codes were previously enacted in 1928 and 1981. The Code of 1928 was derived from two earlier codes, the Code Civil of 1804 and the Codice Civile of 1865, which were respectively from France and Italy. The Code of 1928 introduced civil marriage, whereas previously only religious marriages had legal recognition. The Code of 1981 was communist.

Courts and judiciary

There is a Constitutional Court and a Supreme Court. There are appeals courts, district courts and administrative courts.

Legal practioners
There is a National Chamber of Advocates, or National Chamber of Advocacy, or College of Advocates, or Albanian Bar Association (Albanian: Dhoma Kombëtare e Avokatisë or Dhoma Kombëtare e Avokatëve or Dhoma e Avokatëve; abbreviated "DHKA").

Criminal law

Legislation has included the Criminal Code of 1 October 1977, the Criminal Code of 27 January 1995 and the Code of Criminal Procedure of 21 March 1995.

See also
Albanian nationality law
Kanun of Lekë Dukagjini

References
Pries, Anne. In Winterton and Moys (eds). Information Sources in Law. Second Edition. Bowker-Saur. 1997. . Chapter Three: Albania. Pages 47 to 58.
Margaret Hasluck. The Unwritten Law in Albania. Edited by J H Hutton. Cambridge University Press. 1954. First paperback edition. 2015. Google Books.
Yair Baranes and Ronald C C Cuming. Handbook on the Albanian Collateral Law. (Issues in Business Environment Reform). World Bank. International Bank for Reconstruction and Development and International Finance Corporation. Washington DC. 2001. Google Books.
Nelson Lancione. Preliminary Study of Certain Financial Laws and Institutions: Albania. Treasury Department, Office of the General Counsel. November 1944. Google Books.
Erjona Bana (Canaj). Migration Law in Albania. Wolters Kluwer. 2019. Google Books.
Ilir Mustafaj. Legal Treatment of Contract according to the Albanian Legislation. Edizioni Nuova Cultura. 2014. Google Books.
Juliana Latifi. "Albanian Civil Law and the Influence of Foreign Laws". Farran, Gallen, Hendry and Rautenbach (eds). The Diffusion of Law. Ashgate Publishing. 2015. Routledge. 2016. Chapter 12. p 181 et seq.
Enyal Shuke. "Albania". Arbitration Law and Practice in Central and Eastern Europe. Release 02. Juris Publishing. 2011.  p ALB-1 et seq.
Roberto Scarciglia. Administrative Law in the Balkans. CEDAM. 2012. Google Books.
Evis Karandrea. "Church and State in Albania". Ferrari and Durham (eds). Law and Religion in Post-communist Europe. Peeters. 2003. p 23 et seq.
Jacobs and Craig. Albanian Law on City Planning. Land Tenure Center, University of Wisconsin-Madison. 1997. Google Books.

External links

Guide to Law Online - Albania from the Library of Congress.